Danilo Aleksandar Petrović-Njegoš (29 June 1872 – 24 September 1939) was the Crown Prince of Montenegro. He was the eldest son of King Nicholas I of Montenegro and Queen Milena Vukotić.

Life
During the Balkan Wars and World War I he led the Montenegrin Army with his father (the King), Janko Vukotić, and Mitar Martinović. On 1 March 1921 Danilo was proclaimed the rightful King of Montenegro (upon the death of his father) and became head of the government-in-exile until 7 March 1921 when, for reasons that are still unclear, Danilo renounced his royal claims and headship of the royal house in favour of his nephew, Prince Michael of Montenegro. His reputation was undermined by announcing his renunciation on 5 March only to publicly retract this the following day, before re-affirming it the day after that. His decision was met with much dismay amongst the Montenegrin expatriate community.

After his renunciation in 1921, Prince Danilo resurfaced in 1927 when he sued Metro-Goldwyn-Mayer for libel and collected $4,000 in a Paris court for the false depiction of him in the first Hollywood version of the film The Merry Widow. In the film, "Prince Danilo of Montenegro" seduces a commoner and then rejects her because it could impoverish the royal treasury. He then regrets his actions and tries to win her back, but fails to convince her of his true love. The film bears no relation to reality.

The film was remade after the lawsuit. In addition to demoting the prince to a captain, the date of the action was changed from 1905 to 1885, when the real prince was a young boy. Captain Danilo is sent by the King of an unnamed Balkan country to romance that country’s richest widow. She is in Paris, and the Captain’s mission is to make sure she (and her wealth) do not get snapped up by some foreigner. He finds the trip, and work, congenial, and has a generally pleasant outlook on life. This version bought no lawsuit.

Personal life
Prince Danilo was married to Duchess Jutta of Mecklenburg (1880–1946), Duchess of Mecklenburg-Strelitz and by birth member of the House of Mecklenburg. She was the eldest daughter of Adolf Friedrich V, Grand Duke of Mecklenburg-Strelitz and his wife, Princess Elisabeth of Anhalt, granddaughter of British Princess Augusta of Cambridge. The marriage was childless. After his renunciation in 1921, Danilo spent most of his life living in Nice.

He died in Vienna (which had recently been annexed by Nazi Germany) in 1939 without children.

Danilo is famous as a one-time composer, composing the music for the Serb patriotic song of his father King Nikola Onamo, 'namo!, which he published in Prague.

Gallery

References

External links

 Family of King Nikola Petrovic Njegos
 "Cinema: The New Pictures: Oct. 22, 1934". Time. October 22, 1934.

People from Cetinje
1871 births
1939 deaths
Petrović-Njegoš dynasty
Princes of Montenegro
Pretenders to the Montenegrin throne
Eastern Orthodox Christians from Montenegro
Montenegrin soldiers
Montenegrin military personnel of the Balkan Wars
Montenegrin military personnel of World War I
19th-century Montenegrin people
20th-century Montenegrin people
Montenegrin nobility
Burials at the Vienna Central Cemetery
Heirs apparent who never acceded
Sons of kings